Spring Festival may refer to:

 Chinese New Year, as it is referred to in China
 Holi, a spring festival in India
 Kakava, a spring festival of the Romani people in Turkey
 Nowruz, an Iranian festival that occurs on the first day of spring
 Tết, a festival in Vietnam
 Spring Day, a holiday observed in several countries
 The Spring Festival, a 1991 Chinese film